Gastón Etlis (born 4 November 1974) is a former tennis player from Argentina.

The right-hander won four career titles in doubles, and reached his highest ATP rankings of World No. 114 in singles May 2000 and World No. 17 in doubles in January 2005. Etlis' greatest success in singles came in the final tournament of his singles career, reaching the semifinals of Costa do Sauípe in 2003.

Tennis career
Etlis turned professional in 1993. He is of Jewish descent.

Singles
Highlight victories include wins over World No. 40 Carlos Costa in 1995 and World No. 24 Marc Rosset in 1997.

Etlis competed in the singles events at the 1996 Australian Open and the 1996 and 1997 French Open. He then primarily focussed on doubles.

Doubles
From 2000, Etlis's primary doubles partner was Martin Rodriguez.

In 2000 and 2002, he reached the third round of the French Open.

Etlis competed in the doubles competition of the 2003 Australian Open; he and partner Rodriguez reached the semifinals. After defeating Leander Paes and David Rikl (6–3, 6–3) in the quarterfinals, they lost 3–6, 4–6 played to # 1 seed Mark Knowles and Daniel Nestor. At the 2003 French Open Etlis and Rodriquez reached the quarterfinals, losing to Paul Haarhuis and Yevgeny Kafelnikov. Etlis also competed in mixed doubles with Clarisa Fernández at Roland Garros in 2003. They lost in the quarterfinals to # 4 seed Cara Black and Wayne Black, 6–3, 6–3. Etlis and Rodriguez reached the 3rd round at the 2003 Wimbledon tournament.

In 2004, Etlis and Rodriguez made it to the semifinals at the 2004 Australian Open, where they were defeated 6–2, 7–5 by Michaël Llodra and Fabrice Santoro. They reached the quarterfinal of the 2004 French Open, where they were defeated 6–4, 6–4 by the Belgian team of Xavier Malisse and Olivier Rochus. Etlis and Rodriguez won the Valencia International Series in April 2004.

Olympics
He represented Argentina at the 1996 Summer Olympics in Atlanta, United States, where he was defeated in the first round by South Africa's Wayne Ferreira.

In the 2004 Olympics he competed in the doubles event with partner Martin Rodriguez, defeating Tommy Robredo and Feliciano López of Spain in the first round and losing to the eventual gold medallists Fernando González and Nicolás Massú in the second.

Davis Cup
Etlis split two Davis Cup matches in 1996.

Career finals

Doubles (4 wins, 10 losses)

See also
List of select Jewish tennis players

References

External links
 
 
 
 Jewish Virtual Library bio

1974 births
Argentine Jews
Argentine male tennis players
Jewish tennis players
Jewish Argentine sportspeople
Living people
Olympic tennis players of Argentina
Tennis players from Buenos Aires
Tennis players at the 1996 Summer Olympics
Tennis players at the 2004 Summer Olympics
South American Games medalists in tennis
South American Games silver medalists for Argentina
South American Games bronze medalists for Argentina
Competitors at the 1990 South American Games